The Sri Lankan cricket team toured Australia between 31 October and 7 November 2010. The tour consisted of one T20I and three One Day Internationals. Sri Lanka's One Day International series victory was their first series win in Australia.

T20I series

Only T20I

ODI series

1st ODI

2nd ODI

3rd ODI

Tour matches

List A: Queensland vs Sri Lankans

List A: New South Wales vs Sri Lankans

Twenty20: New South Wales vs Sri Lankans

Media coverage

Television
Star Cricket: India and Sri Lanka
Sky Sports: UK
Nine Network/GEM: Australia
Arab Radio and Television Network: Middle East
Willow Cricket: USA
ATN Cricket Plus: Canada

References

2010-11
2010 in Australian cricket
2010–11 Australian cricket season
International cricket competitions in 2010–11
2010 in Sri Lankan cricket